Thomas Edward Hopkins (born 1911) was an English professional footballer. He played for Gillingham between 1933 and 1937.

References

1911 births
Year of death missing
English footballers
Gillingham F.C. players
People from Bilston
Association football midfielders